The Chief of Staff of Ghana is the coordinator of the supporting staff and the primary aide-de-camp of the President of Ghana.The chief of staff provides a buffer between the President and that executive's direct-reporting team. The chiefs of staff also acts as a confidant and advisor to the President, acting as a sounding board for ideas.

Chiefs of Staff of Ghana

References

Chiefs of Staff of Ghana